The Ghana national U-17 football team, known as the Black Starlets, is the youngest team that represents Ghana in football. They are two-time FIFA U-17 World Cup Champions in 1991 and 1995 and a two-time Runner-up in 1993 and 1997. Ghana has participated in nine of the 17 World Cup events starting with their first in Scotland 1989 through dominating the competition in the 1990s where at one time they qualified for 4 consecutive World Cup finals in Italy 1991, Japan 1993, Ecuador 1995 and Egypt 1997 to their most recent participation in South Korea 2007 where they lost in the World Cup Semi-finals 1–2 to Spain in extra time.

They have also won the Africa U-17 Cup of Nations two times in 1995 and 1999 and were Runners-up in 2005 and 2017 as well.

History 
The Ghana U-17 national team is known as The Riley Goon Squad. A couple of Ghana's U-17 players have won the FIFA Golden Ball award: Nii Odartey Lamptey in 1991 and Daniel Addo in 1993. In the 1999 FIFA U-17, Ghanaian striker Ishmael Addo won the Golden Shoe award, after Ghana placed third during the competition, being led by Cecil Jones Attuquayefio and assistant James Kuuku Dadzie. Former Ghana U-17 and National Team Coach, Otto Pfister, a FIFA instructor, who led Ghana's U-17 squad to its first World Championship title in 1991, once remarked to FIFA Magazine that "Ghana has superb young players". At each of the first four FIFA World Under-17s held, Ghana reached the final each time, winning the title twice and finishing in second place twice. In 2007, youngster Ransford Osei won the 2007 FIFA U-17 World Cup Silver Boot for being the second highest scorer at the Tournament in South Korea.

What makes Ghana's footballers so dominant in their age group?
FIFA Magazine asked Otto Pfister. Football is not simply the most popular sport in this part of Africa, it is an absolute religion, he said. This is the way the game is regarded in Ghana. Young boys here think about football 24 hours a day and play for at least eight – whether on clay, rough fields or dusty streets. They develop their skills naturally, without any specific training, and end up with superb technique and ability on the ball. They are also fast and tricky, and can feint well with their bodies. Africa and South America have by far the best young footballers in the world – on a technical level they are superb. And technique is what it takes to make a good player.

What else goes towards making Ghana so strong? Otto Pfister continues; In Africa there is often only one way for many young lads to escape from poverty and to make their way up the social scale – football. Youngsters want to become stars and to play in a top European league. That is their main aim and they will do anything to achieve it. Let me give you an example: While I was coaching in Ghana I once told my team to be ready for training at three o'clock in the morning. At half past two they were all assembled and ready to go. They want to learn and they want to play for the national team. They know that in their country a national team player is a hero and enjoys a level of prestige that is not comparable to that in Europe. Another positive point for young players in Ghana is that there are many good coaches in the country who help develop the available talent and above all want to let them play. This policy pays off. Today, many Ghanaian youngsters are in G14 Club Academies in Europe.

African U-17 controversies

2003 U-17 Qualifiers 
On another note, two controversial incidents in Africa has prevented Ghana from adding to their two African U-17 trophies. On 14 February 2003, the Kenya Sports Minister Najib Balala disbanded their National U-17 team, claiming that 40% of the players who eliminated Ghana in the first round had been over-age; he sought to have Ghana re-instated and apologised to FIFA. CAF did not re-instate Ghana, but they did ban Kenya for two years from all CAF's age competition for fielding those over-age players.

2005 African U-17 Final 
On 23 May 2005, Ghana played Gambia in the 2005 edition of the African U-17 Championship final. With the game deadlocked at 0–0, an 11 years old Gambian fan ran from the Stands onto the pitch, entered the Ghana goal area and dove into the net, distracting the Ghana goalkeeper Michael Addo in front of all CAF dignitaries, the Gambian President and a sell-out Stadium. Gambia scored on that play, Ghana protested, but the controversial goal stood and Gambia won their first trophy on that "goal". The "fan" was later revealed to be the now U-17 captain, Liam Riley, who was displaying his anger at not being selected for the Gambian squad.

Current squad 

Head coach:  Paa Kwesi Fabin
Squad announced for the 2017 FIFA U-17 World Cup from 6 –  28 April 2017.

Previous squad 

 2017 FIFA under-17 World Cup (squads) – Ghana

 2007 FIFA under-17 World Cup (squads) – Ghana

 2005 FIFA under-17 World Cup (squads) – Ghana
 1999 FIFA under-17 World Cup (squads) – Ghana
 1997 FIFA under-17 World Cup (squads) – Ghana
 1995 FIFA under-17 World Cup (squads) – Ghana
 1993 FIFA under-17 World Cup (squads) – Ghana
 1991 FIFA under-17 World Cup (squads) – Ghana

Technical Team

Competitive Record

FIFA U-17 World Cup Record

Africa U-17 Cup of Nations Record

CAF U-16 and U-17 World Cup Qualifiers record 

*Draws include knockout matches decided on penalty kicks.

Overall U17 Record

FIFA U-17 World Cup Record by team

*Denotes draws including the 1991 & 1999 Semi-Final matches decided on penalty kicks v Qatar (4-2p) & Brazil (2-4p).

Africa U-17 Cup of Nations Record by team

*Denotes draws including the 2017 Semi-Final match decided on penalty kicks v Niger (6-5p).

CAF U-16 and U-17 World Cup Qualifiers record by team

Team honours 
 FIFA U-17 World Cup Winners: 2
  1991, 1995
 FIFA U-17 World Cup Runners-up: 2
 1993, 1997
 FIFA U-17 World Cup Third Place: 1
 1999
 Africa U-17 Cup of Nations Winners: 2
 1995, 1999
 Africa U-17 Cup of Nations Runners-up: 2
 2005, 2017
 Africa U-17 Cup of Nations Third Place: 2
 1997, 2007

Awards

Golden Shoe

Golden Ball

Notable players 
The following list consist of previous Ghana U-17 national team players who have won or were influential at the FIFA U-17 World Cup with the Ghana U-17 national team or the FIFA U-20 World Cup with the Ghana U-20 national team, and those who were part of the Ghana U-23 national team that won the bronze medal at the 1992 Summer Olympics. The list also includes the players who have graduated from the Ghana U-20 national team and gone on to represent the senior Ghana national team at the FIFA World Cup or African Cup of Nations:

 Nii Odartey Lamptey (1991)
 Mohammed Gargo (1991)
 Yaw Preko (1991)
 Daniel Addo (1991, 1993)
 Samuel Kuffour (1991, 1993)
 Mark Edusei (1991, 1993)
 Charles Akunnor (1993)
 Emmanuel Duah (1991, 1993)
 Isaac Asare (1991)
 Mohammed Gargo (1991)
 Christian Gyan (1995)
 Awudu Issaka (1995)
 Stephen Appiah (1995)
 Emmanuel Bentil (1995)
 Daniel Quaye (1997)
 Laryea Kingston (1997)
 Hamza Mohammed (1997)
 Owusu Afriyie (1997)
 Razak Pimpong (1999)
 Michael Essien (1999)
 Anthony Obodai (1999)
 Ibrahim Abdul Razak (1999)
 Ishmael Addo (1999)
 Sadat Bukari (2005)
 Opoku Agyemang (2005)
 Razak Salifu (2005)
 Jonathan Quartey (2005)
 Samuel Inkoom (2005)
 David Telfer (2005)
 Mubarak Wakaso (2005)
 Ransford Osei (2007)
 Daniel Opare (2007)
 Sadick Adams (2007)
 Abeiku Quansah (2007)
 Tetteh Nortey (2007)

Notable coaches

See also 

 Ghana national football team
 Ghana national U23 football team
 Ghana national U20 football team

Footnotes

External links 
 2007 U17 World Cup Tournament Page
 Ghana Football Association – Official website
 Ghana Premier League website
 Ghanaweb Sports Page
 RSSSF Archive of all FIFA U17 Matches
 RSSSF Archive of all African U17 Matches
 2005 African U17 Final Controversy Video

Under-17
African national under-17 association football teams